Johannes Gerhardus Maritz (born 20 December 1990) is a Namibian hurdler. He competed in the 400 metres hurdles event at the 2015 World Championships in Beijing without qualifying for the semifinals. His personal best in the 400 metres hurdles is 50.14 set in Potchefstroom in 2015.

Competition record

References

External links

1990 births
Living people
Namibian male hurdlers
World Athletics Championships athletes for Namibia
Athletes (track and field) at the 2011 All-Africa Games
Athletes (track and field) at the 2015 African Games
Commonwealth Games competitors for Namibia
Athletes (track and field) at the 2018 Commonwealth Games
Sportspeople from Windhoek
Competitors at the 2011 Summer Universiade
Competitors at the 2013 Summer Universiade
Competitors at the 2017 Summer Universiade
African Games competitors for Namibia